In enzymology, a cycloartenol 24-C-methyltransferase is an enzyme that catalyzes the chemical reaction

S-adenosyl-L-methionine + cycloartenol  S-adenosyl-L-homocysteine + (24R)-24-methylcycloart-25-en-3beta-ol

Thus, the two substrates of this enzyme are S-adenosyl methionine and cycloartenol, whereas its two products are S-adenosylhomocysteine and (24R)-24-methylcycloart-25-en-3beta-ol.

This enzyme belongs to the family of transferases, specifically those transferring one-carbon group methyltransferases.  The systematic name of this enzyme class is S-adenosyl-L-methionine:cycloartenol 24-C-methyltransferase. This enzyme is also called sterol C-methyltransferase.

References

 

EC 2.1.1
Enzymes of unknown structure